Benzyl mercaptan is an organosulfur compound with the formula C6H5CH2SH. It is a common laboratory alkylthiol that occurs in trace amounts naturally. It is a colorless, malodorous liquid.

Preparation and occurrence
Benzyl mercaptan can be prepared by the reaction of benzyl chloride and thiourea. The initially formed isothiouronium salt must be subjected to alkaline hydrolysis to obtain the thiol.

It has been identified in boxwood (Buxus sempervirens L.) and is known to contribute to the smoky aroma of certain wines. It also occurs naturally in coffee.

Use in organic synthesis
Benzyl mercaptan is used for S-alkylation to give benzylthioethers.

It has been used as a source of the thiol functional group in organic synthesis. Debenzylation can be effected by dissolving metal reduction:
RSCH2C6H5 + 2 H+ + 2 e− → RSH  +  CH3C6H5

Condensed tannins undergo acid-catalyzed cleavage in the presence of benzyl mercaptan.

Related derivatives
Methoxy-substituted benzyl mercaptans have been developed that cleave easily, are recyclable, and are odorless.

References

Thiols
Benzyl compounds
Foul-smelling chemicals